Karambaini is a location located at Kiambu County, of east Limuru region of Central Kenya.

Map
https://shulezote.co.ke/school/limuru-girls-sec/

Schools
1. Limuru girls higher secondary school

External links
Location* 
School nearby*

Populated places in Kenya
Kiambu West District
Populated places in Central Province (Kenya)